"Hey Hey, My My (Into the Black)" is a song written by Canadian-American musician Neil Young. Combined with its acoustic counterpart "My My, Hey Hey (Out of the Blue)", it bookends Young's 1979 album Rust Never Sleeps. The song was influenced by the punk rock zeitgeist of the late 1970s, in particular by Young's collaborations with the American art punk band Devo, and what he viewed as his own growing irrelevance.

Origins 
The song "Hey Hey, My My...", as well as the titular phrase of the album on which it was featured, "rust never sleeps," sprang from Young's collaborations with Devo and, in particular, the band's frontman, Mark Mothersbaugh. In 1977, Devo had been asked by Young to participate in the creation of his film, Human Highway, and a scene in the film shows Young playing the song in its entirety with Devo (with Mothersbaugh changing a lyric about "Johnny Rotten" to "Johnny Spud").

On May 28, 1978, Young collaborated with Devo on a version of "Hey Hey, My My (Into the Black)" at the Different Fur studio in San Francisco and would later introduce the song to Crazy Horse. During the Different Fur studio sessions, Mothersbaugh added the lyrics "rust never sleeps", a slogan he remembered from his graphic arts career that promoted the automobile rust proofing product Rust-Oleum. Young adopted the line and used it in the Crazy Horse version of the song, as well as for the title of his album. The lyrics, "It's better to burn out than to fade away." were widely quoted by his peers and by critics.  The line "It's better to burn out than it is to rust" is often credited to Young's friend Jeff Blackburn of The Ducks.

According to Young, the version of the song on Rust Never Sleeps is the same as that on Live Rust, except that for the Rust Never Sleeps version they removed the crowd noise and added sound effects such as hand claps and slamming doors in the studio.

Reception
Cash Box called it a "grinding three-chord rocker" that makes "a challenging musical and lyrical statement" with "thrashing drums and brash fuzz guitar." Record World called it "a perfect anthem with its slam-bang 'rock'n'roll will never die.'"

Texas author and journalist Brad Tyer wrote in the Houston Press that "Hey Hey, My My" was stylistically "proto-grunge grunt rock".

Legacy 

In 1980, the song was used as the title theme of Dennis Hopper's movie Out of the Blue. 
The song later appeared on Young's Greatest Hits in 2004 and was included at #93 in Bob Mersereau's book The Top 100 Canadian Singles in 2010.  The Chromatics version was used as the closing music in HBO's "The Sex Lives of College Girls" season 1, episode1. 

Many other bands and singers have recorded covers of the song, including: Oasis (on the album Familiar to Millions in 2000); System of a Down (at the Festival of Hurricane in 2005); Dave Matthews Band; Cross Canadian Ragweed; Battleme (as the closing track of the season 3 finale of Sons of Anarchy); Rick Derringer; Nomeansno (on the FUBAR soundtrack); Mexican rock and roll band El Tri; Finnish glam rock band Negative; Argentine rock band La Renga; Chromatics; Jake Bugg (at the 2013 Glastonbury Festival); Axel Rudi Pell (on his 2014 album Into the Storm); Billy Talent on Covered in Gold 5.0 (2017); Romanian act Fjord (on their 2016 album Textures); Brazilian doom metal band HellLight (on their 2012 covers album The Light That Brought Darkness); Blixa Bargeld and Teho Teardo (on their 2017 album Fall); French rocker Dominic Sonic in his 1991 album.

Quotations
The lyrics of the song, particularly the line "out of the blue and into the black", are an epigraph and are also featured prominently in Stephen King's novel It.

The line, "It's better to burn out than to fade away", was included in Nirvana frontman Kurt Cobain's suicide note in 1994. It is also referenced in Panic! At The Disco's "Nicotine", Def Leppard's "Rock of Ages", Hole's "Reasons to be Beautiful", Bosse's "Schönste Zeit", Meg Myers' "Some People", Killswitch Engage's "The New Awakening" and most recently Machine Gun Kelly's "27". It is also spoken by The Kurgan (Clancy Brown) in the 1986 fantasy adventure film Highlander in the modern-day church scene. This line is used in Queen's "Gimme the Prize (Kurgan's Theme)" from the album A Kind of Magic, which functioned as that film's soundtrack. It is also referenced to in Lifeless Stars by  Palaye Royale

References

Sources

External links 
 HyperRust Never Sleeps - a Neil Young database with information and further lyrics
 Sonic Youth and Neil Young - details Sonic Youth's involvement with Young during the early 1990s

Neil Young songs
1979 singles
Songs written by Neil Young
Oasis (band) songs
Songs about suicide
Songs about rock music
Song recordings produced by David Briggs (record producer)
1979 songs
Reprise Records singles
Music videos directed by Julien Temple
Song recordings produced by Neil Young
Crazy Horse (band) songs